Robert Parkinson Farm  is a historic property in Morris Township, Pennsylvania.  The contributing buildings are the c. 1830 house, c. 1830 banked barn, c. 1870 sheep barn, c. 1880 hay shed, c. 1880 spring house, and a c. 1920 privy.  The house is a five-bay center passage farmhouse with an attached rear kitchen in a T-shaped floor plan.  The Parkinson Farm is an example of an early 19th-century sheep farm, and it continued to operate as such until about 1960.

It is designated as a historic residential landmark/farmstead by the Washington County History & Landmarks Foundation, and is listed on the National Register of Historic Places.

References

Houses on the National Register of Historic Places in Pennsylvania
Houses in Washington County, Pennsylvania
1830 establishments in Pennsylvania
National Register of Historic Places in Washington County, Pennsylvania